Stourm ar Brezhoneg (« Le Combat de la langue bretonne ») is a Breton association founded in 1984 which calls for an official statute for the Breton language in public life.

 Signage: Along with other groups it calls for bilingual signage using the modern and standard nomenclature in Breton. Its actions include "defacement" of monolingual signage (similar to that done by the Welsh organisation Cymdeithas yr Iaith Gymraeg. Today several large towns have adapted bilingual signage, for example: Brest, Quimper, Carhaix, Lorient, and Lanester. They are also in use in Finistère, Morbihan and the Breton-speaking parts of Côtes-d'Armor and Loire-Atlantique.
 Audiovisual: Protests against the restriction of programming in the Breton language on television stations. Calls for a Breton television station and to stop paying the television licence until broadcasts in Breton are made.
 Other: Testifying in Breton before the courts, boycott of the population census, writing of cheques in Breton, calls for introducing Breton ticket distribution interfaces.

Breton language